Montréal (historically, Montréal-du-Gers; Gascon: Montrejau de Gers) is a commune in the Gers department in southwestern France.

Geography
The commune is situated in the Gers but close to the borders with Lot-et-Garonne and Landes. It is built on a promontory on the right bank of the river Auzoue.

Population

The inhabitants are called Montréalais.

Sights
In the neighbourhood are numerous old castles, medieval walled villages, small towns built around castles and many "sacred" places because the Via Podiensis and the Way of St. James of Compostela which pass through Montréal.

 In the village
 The Roman Gaul villa at Séviac.
 The medieval bastide.
 In the surroundings
 The bastide of Bretagne-d'Armagnac.
 The Bastide Gasconne of Fourcès.
 The city of Eauze and its Roman treasure.
 The fortified village of Larressingle.
 The museum of D'Artagnan in Lupiac.
 The Spa of Barbotan-les-Thermes in Cazaubon.
 The paleontological site discovered in 1987 near Béon hamlet (on the D113 road toward Gondrin, south-east of the village), of international interest - 4 previously unknown species have been discovered there, and a skull from a Palaeomeryx among many other animal parts.

International relations
Montréal is twinned with Wittisheim, Bas-Rhin, France.

See also
Communes of the Gers department

References
Official website of Montréal

Communes of Gers
Plus Beaux Villages de France